= Dasmapura =

Village in Karnataka, India

Dashamapura is a village in Vijayanagara district in the southern state of Karnataka, India.

== See also ==
- Bellary
- Districts of Karnataka
